Füzuli Javad ogly Javadov (20 December 1950 – 11 April 2021) was an Azerbaijani professional footballer who played as a defender.

Club career
He made his professional debut in the Soviet Top League in 1971 for FC SKA Rostov-on-Don.

Personal life
Javadov was the father of Azerbaijani international football player Vagif Javadov, whilst his brother Isgandar Javadov was also a football player.

Death 
On 11 April 2021, Javadov died from complications related to COVID-19 during the COVID-19 pandemic in Azerbaijan.

References

1950 births
2021 deaths
Footballers from Baku
Soviet footballers
Association football defenders
Soviet Top League players
Neftçi PFK players
Soviet Azerbaijani people
FC SKA Rostov-on-Don players
Araz-Naxçıvan PFK players
Deaths from the COVID-19 pandemic in Azerbaijan